The 1991 Atlanta Braves season was the 26th in Atlanta and the 121st overall. They became the first team in the National League to go from last place one year to first place the next, doing so after remaining 9.5 games out of first at the All Star break.  Coincidentally, the Braves' last-to-first feat was also accomplished by the 1991 Minnesota Twins, the team they would face in the 1991 World Series. The last Major League Baseball team to accomplish this was the 1890 Louisville Colonels of the American Association.  The 1991 World Series, which the Braves ultimately lost, has been called the greatest World Series in history by ESPN.

Despite finishing last in the National League West in 1990, the Braves managed to overtake the Los Angeles Dodgers for first place in 1991, clinching the division on the penultimate day of the regular season. This was the first of three consecutive division titles won by the Braves.

Offseason
 December 3, 1990: Terry Pendleton was signed as a free agent by the Braves.
 December 5, 1990: Sid Bream was signed as a free agent by the Braves.
 December 7, 1990: Juan Berenguer was signed as a free agent by the Braves.
 January 19, 1991: Jerry Willard was signed as a free agent by the Braves.
 January 30, 1991: Deion Sanders was signed as a free agent by the Braves.
 February 8, 1991: Jim Vatcher was selected off waivers from the Braves by the San Diego Padres.
 March 9, 1991: Randy St. Claire was signed as a free agent by the Braves.

Regular season
Kent Mercker, Mark Wohlers and Alejandro Pena combined for a no-hitter on September 11, 1991 in a 1-0 shutout win over the San Diego Padres. The 13th no-hitter in franchise history, attendance was 20,477 at Fulton-County Stadium.

Opening Day starters
 Rafael Belliard
 Sid Bream
 Ron Gant
 Mike Heath
 David Justice
 Terry Pendleton
 Deion Sanders
 John Smoltz
 Jeff Treadway

Season standings

Record vs. opponents

Notable transactions
 April 1, 1991: Jimmy Kremers and a player to be named later were traded by the Braves to the Montreal Expos for Otis Nixon and Boi Rodriguez (minors). The Braves completed the deal by sending Keith Morrison (minors) to the Expos on June 3, 1991.
 May 6, 1991: Kevin Castleberry (minors) was traded by the Braves to the Chicago White Sox for Danny Heep.
 June 14, 1991: Rick Mahler was signed as a free agent by the Braves.
 June 17, 1991: Danny Heep was released by the Braves.
 August 8, 1991: Rick Mahler was released by the Braves.
 August 28, 1991: Tony Castillo and a player to be named later was traded by the Braves to the New York Mets for Alejandro Peña. The Braves completed the deal by sending Joe Roa to the Mets on August 29.
 September 29, 1991: Turk Wendell and Yorkis Pérez were traded by the Braves to the Chicago Cubs for Damon Berryhill and Mike Bielecki.

Notable events
 July 31, 1991: Two-sport star Deion Sanders helps the Atlanta Braves overcome a 6-2 deficit with a three-run homer in the fifth inning in an 8-6 win over the Pittsburgh Pirates. The next day, Sanders reports to the Atlanta Falcons for training camp, as his NFL contract stipulated.
 September 11, 1991: Kent Mercker, Mark Wohlers, and Alejandro Peña combine to no-hit the San Diego Padres, the seventh no-hitter of 1991. Controversy ensues when Tony Gwynn apparently ends the no-hitter with two outs in the ninth inning but the official scorer rules it an error on Terry Pendleton.
 September 16, 1991: Otis Nixon, the league's leading base stealer, fails a drug test and is suspended for 60 days, consisting of the rest of the 1991 baseball season and the first six weeks of the 1992 season. The Braves lose the first two games without Nixon but rebound to win the National League pennant.

Draft picks
June 3, 1991: 1991 Major League Baseball draft
Mike Kelly was drafted by the Braves in the 1st round (2nd pick). Player signed July 22, 1991.
Jason Schmidt was drafted by the Braves in the 8th round. Player signed June 14, 1991.

Roster

Player stats

Batting

Starters by position
Note: Pos = Position; G = Games played; AB = At bats; R = Runs; H = Hits; HR = Home runs; RBI = Runs batted in; Avg. = Batting average; SB = Stolen bases

Other batters
Note: G = Games played; AB = At bats; R = Runs; H = Hits; Avg. = Batting average; HR = Home runs; RBI = Runs batted in; SB = Stolen bases

Pitching

Starting pitchers
Note: G = Games played; IP = Innings pitched; W = Wins; L = Losses; ERA = Earned run average; SO = Strikeouts; BB = Bases on Balls

Other pitchers
Note: G = Games played; IP = Innings pitched; W = Wins; L = Losses; SV = Saves; ERA = Earned run average; SO = Strikeouts; BB = Bases on Balls

Relief pitchers
Note: G = Games played; IP = Innings pitched; W = Wins; L = Losses; SV = Saves; ERA = Earned run average; SO = Strikeouts; BB = Bases on Balls

National League Championship Series

Avery's amazing season continued with one of the greatest postseason performances of all-time. He shut out the Pittsburgh Pirates for 16.2 innings over two games and accumulated two 1-0 wins. His performance earned him MVP honors for the 1991 NLCS.

Game 1
October 9: Three Rivers Stadium in Pittsburgh, Pennsylvania

Game 2
October 10: Three Rivers Stadium in Pittsburgh, Pennsylvania

Game 3
October 12: Atlanta–Fulton County Stadium in Atlanta

Game 4
October 13: Atlanta–Fulton County Stadium in Atlanta

Game 5
October 14: Atlanta–Fulton County Stadium in Atlanta

Game 6
October 16: Three Rivers Stadium in Pittsburgh, Pennsylvania

Game 7
October 17: Three Rivers Stadium in Pittsburgh, Pennsylvania

World Series

Game 1
October 19, 1991, at Hubert H. Humphrey Metrodome in Minneapolis, Minnesota

Game 2
October 20, 1991, at Hubert H. Humphrey Metrodome in Minneapolis, Minnesota

Game 3
October 22, 1991, at Atlanta–Fulton County Stadium in Atlanta

Game 4
October 23, 1991, at Atlanta–Fulton County Stadium in Atlanta

Game 5
October 24, 1991, at Atlanta–Fulton County Stadium in Atlanta

Game 6
October 26, 1991, at Hubert H. Humphrey Metrodome in Minneapolis, Minnesota

Game 7
October 27, 1991, at Hubert H. Humphrey Metrodome in Minneapolis, Minnesota

For the first time since 1962, a seventh game of the World Series ended with a 1-0 verdict. It was also the second time in five that the home team won all seven games of a World Series.

Award winners
 Steve Avery, NLCS MVP
 Bobby Cox, Sporting News Manager of the Year Award
 Ron Gant, OF, Silver Slugger
 Tom Glavine, National League Pitcher of the Month, May
 Tom Glavine, National League Cy Young Award
 Tom Glavine, Silver Slugger
 Tom Glavine, The Sporting News Pitcher of the Year Award
 David Justice, National League Player of the Month, May
 Terry Pendleton, National League Most Valuable Player

1991 Major League Baseball All-Star Game
 Tom Glavine, pitcher, starter

Team leaders
 Home runs –  Ron Gant (32)
 Runs batted in – Ron Gant (105)
 Batting average – Terry Pendleton (.319)
 Hits – Terry Pendleton (187)
 Stolen bases – Otis Nixon (72)
 Walks – Otis Nixon (71)
 Wins – Tom Glavine (20)
 Earned run average – Tom Glavine (2.55)
 Strikeouts – Tom Glavine (192)
 Saves – Juan Berenguer (17)

Farm system

LEAGUE CHAMPIONS: Pulaski

References

 1991 Atlanta Braves at Baseball Reference
 Atlanta Braves on Baseball Almanac

See also
 1991 National League Championship Series
 1991 World Series

Atlanta Braves seasons
Atlanta Braves season
National League West champion seasons
National League champion seasons
Atlanta Braves